Hansjörg Felmy (born Hans-Jörg Hellmuth Felmy; 31 January 1931 – 24 August 2007) was a German actor.

He appeared in 50 films and television shows between 1957 and 1995. Films like Der Stern von Afrika and Wir Wunderkinder made him a well-known actor in the late 1950s. He starred in the film The Marriage of Mr. Mississippi (1961), which was entered into the 11th Berlin International Film Festival. In the popular German television crime series Tatort he played police investigator Heinz Haferkamp from 1974 to 1980. In an international film appearance, he played the Stasi officer Heinrich Gerhard in Alfred Hitchcock's Torn Curtain (1966) who hunts the leading characters played by Julie Andrews and Paul Newman.

In his last years he suffered from osteoporosis. He died in Eching near Munich. Felmy was the son of the German airforce general and war criminal Hellmuth Felmy (1885-1965).

Selected filmography

 Der Stern von Afrika (1957) - Robert Franke
  (1957) - Teichmann
 The Heart of St. Pauli (1957) - Hein Jensen
 The Copper (1958) - Harry Dennert
 Heart Without Mercy (1958) - Ulrich Rombach
 The Muzzle (1958) - Georg Rabanus
 Wir Wunderkinder (1958) - Hans Boeckel
 Restless Night (1958) - Fedor Baranowski
 The Man Who Sold Himself (1959) - Niko Jost
 People in the Net (1959) - Klaus Martens
 The Forests Sing Forever (1959) - Tore Björndal
 The Buddenbrooks (1959) - Thomas Buddenbrook
  (1959) - Robert Wissmann
  (1960) - Fred Ploetz
 Brainwashed (1960) - Hans Berger
 The Ambassador (1960) - Jan Möller
 Sacred Waters (1960) - Roman Blatter
 The Marriage of Mr. Mississippi (1961) - Graf Bodo von Überlohe-Zabernsee
 The Shadows Grow Longer (1961) - Max
  (1961) - Daniel Utby
  (1962) - Mann mit Feuer (uncredited)
 The Happy Years of the Thorwalds (1962) - Peter Thorwald
 Station Six-Sahara (1963) - Martin
 The Pirates of the Mississippi (1963) - Sheriff James Lively
  (1963) - John Hillier
 Murderer in the Fog (1964) - Kommissar Hauser
 The Monster of London City (1964) - Richard Sand 
 The Seventh Victim (1964) - Peter Brooks
 When the Grapevines Bloom on the Danube (1965) - Frank Richter
 Torn Curtain (1966) - Heinrich Gerhard
  (1967, TV miniseries) - Bert Gregor
 The Body in the Thames (1971) - Inspector Craig
 Alexander Zwo (1972–1973, TV miniseries) - Klaus Müller
  (1976) - Truck driver
 Tatort (1974–1980, TV series) - Heinz Haferkamp
 Overheard (1984, TV film) - Christopher Caulker
 Die Wilsheimer (1987, TV series) - Jean Ziegler
  (1989, TV film) - Friedrich Seyfried
 Abenteuer Airport (1990, TV series) - Charly Kapitzki
  (1994, TV series) - Paul Hagedorn

References

External links

1931 births
2007 deaths
Male actors from Berlin
German male film actors
German male television actors
20th-century German male actors